When Men Betray is a 1929 race film directed, written, produced and distributed by Oscar Micheaux. The film details the plight of a young woman who falls in love and marries a glib con artist who abandons her without money on their wedding night.

No print of When Men Betray is known to exist and it is presumed to be a lost film.

References

External links

1929 films
Lost American films
Films directed by Oscar Micheaux
American black-and-white films
American silent feature films
Race films
1929 drama films
Silent American drama films
1929 lost films
Lost drama films
1920s English-language films
1920s American films